Rek Hill is an unincorporated community in eastern Fayette County, Texas, United States.

External links
 REK HILL, TX Handbook of Texas Online.

Unincorporated communities in Fayette County, Texas
Unincorporated communities in Texas